Jonathan Ross Reid, more commonly known as Jonny Reid, (born 18 October 1983, in Auckland) is a New Zealand racing driver.

Career

Early career 
Reid started his career in karting at the age of 8. In 1996, Reid won his first title, the New Zealand North Island Championship in the rookie class. In 1997, he went on to win the North Island Championship in the Junior Class. In 1998, he won the North Island Championship again, this time in the Junior Intercontinental Class. In 1999, Reid won his first New Zealand Championship in Junior Stock which was preceded by wins in the Pro series.

In 2002, Reid won the New Zealand Formula Ford Festival for the second year in a row, the New Zealand Championship and the New Zealand Grand Prix. In 2003, Reid was awarded Motorsport New Zealand's Steel Memorial Trophy, given annually to an under-21 New Zealand racing driver who "displays dedication, skill and a level of professionalism in their driving aiming to progress to the upper echelons of the sport".

Reid drove for Graham Watson's Ralt Australia team in the 2003 Australian Drivers' Championship. He achieved second in the championship, amassing four pole positions, five race wins and three round victories. Reid finished the season with pole position and wins in both races in Round 6 at Eastern Creek.

V8 Supercars 
Reid made his V8 Supercars debut in the 2003 Bathurst 1000 with Alan Gurr for Robert Smith Racing. However, he did not drive in the race itself, as Gurr was forced to retire the car after four laps due to a mechanical failure.

A1 Grand Prix 
In the 2005-06 season, Reid was twice called up by New Zealand to race in the A1 Grand Prix. Together with Matt Halliday, who competed in the rest of the rounds for the team, the pair won 77 points, placing the team in fourth position overall.

Reid was called up for seven of the eleven rounds in 2006–07, with Halliday once again completing the remaining rounds. The car was dubbed 'Black Beauty' by both the team and New Zealand media. In his first round of the season at Brno Circuit, Reid qualified on pole, A1 Team New Zealand's first pole position. However, before the first corner of the sprint race, Reid collided with Nico Hülkenberg of Team Germany, leading to both drivers retiring from the race.

In the fourth round of the A1GP in Malaysia in Sepang International Circuit, Reid and Hülkenberg collided in the sprint race once again. However, Reid continued racing despite a damaged suspension and came 3rd, Team New Zealand's first podium. After doubling Team New Zealand's points in Malaysia, Reid was selected to drive in the fifth round in Indonesia. Reid qualified on pole and won in both the sprint and feature races. This performance led to him being selected for the following event in his home country in January 2007.

"Taupo is in the back of my mind..."

"But this is a hot seat and you have to be performing the whole time if you want to keep it.
I’m just looking to better my game every time I get in that car, so I’ll be pushing myself to qualify on pole and win races. That’s my focus".

Reid finished both races in New Zealand in third place. After three more rounds, including one victory in China, he and Halliday finished second in the championship, only behind Team Germany.

In 2007–08, Reid competed in all rounds of the A1GP season. He won four races, and once again finished second in the championship, this time behind Team Switzerland's Neel Jani.

As a promotion for the New Zealand round, Reid raced his A1GP car against an Air New Zealand Boeing 777-200ER passenger jet at Auckland International Airport. The first try saw the Boeing race past Reid and lift into the sky, while the second attempt saw him beat the 777 just as it was about to lift off. The car reached its top speed of 285 km/h, while the Boeing 777, with little fuel and no passengers or cargo, reached about 280 km/h before it was forced to lift into the sky.

Indy Lights 

Reid passed his Firestone Indy Lights rookie test on 19 May 2008 at Iowa Speedway. Four days later, he made his debut for Integra Motorsports in the 2008 Firestone Freedom 100 on 23 May at the Indianapolis Motor Speedway. At Mid-Ohio Sports Car Course, Reid had a career-best start of third for Race One. He finished fourth, with the grid reversal giving him the pole for Race Two. In wet conditions amidst many Safety Car periods, Reid led most of the race, which was run to time rather than laps due to the delays. Reid took the white flag in second place behind Mitch Cunningham, but Cunningham then crashed at turn one, before a three-car incident further back involving points leader Richard Antinucci brought out the yellow flag. This effectively gave Reid the race win, but, with his radio having failed earlier, he was unclear on the situation and pitted at the end of the lap. He crossed the line in ninth place, giving the win to James Davison. Reid left Integra Motorsports and missed the next race on the schedule. He returned one round later at Infineon Raceway driving a fourth car for Sam Schmidt Motorsports.

Porsche Cup 
In the 2009/10 New Zealand Season he raced in the New Zealand Porsche GT3 Cup, winning three races and finishing second to Craig Baird. He raced again in the 2010/11 season, this time only winning one race and finishing third in the Championship. He joined the revamped Australian Carrera Cup Championship in 2011. He finished second again to Craig Baird driving for McElrea Racing and winning three races. He won the Tudor Fastest Lap award for the most fastest laps in the championship. He also raced in the 2011 Australian GT Championship in the GT Challenge class with John Modystach winning both races they entered.

Return to V8 Supercars 
In 2010, Reid returned to the V8 Supercars series, testing with four other drivers for Kelly Racing in a session designed to evaluate potential co-drivers for the endurance rounds. This was followed up by drives in practice sessions reserved for rookies and co-drivers at the Ipswich and Winton rounds, before another test for the team in June. However, this did not lead to an endurance drive.

Reid tested again in 2011, this time for Tekno Autosports. This led to him being selected by Tekno as the co-driver for Michael Patrizi in the endurance races in 2012.

In February 2013, it was announced that Reid would race full-time for Dick Johnson Racing in the 2013 season. However, he was replaced by Chaz Mostert on 19 April 2013, as Ford Performance Racing and Dick Johnson Racing expanded their partnership.

V8 Super Tourer 
He competed in the first New Zealand V8SuperTourer season in 2012 finishing second to John McIntyre after not finishing in the second race in the final round at Hampton Downs Motorsport Park.

Personal life 
Both his grandfather and his father were known New Zealand racers. His father, Clayton Reid, was a New Zealand champion in karting.

Racing record

Complete Euro Formula 3000 results

Complete A1 Grand Prix results

Complete Indy Lights results

Complete Auto GP results

Complete V8 Supercar results

Complete Bathurst 1000 results

Complete Bathurst 12 Hour results

Other career results

References

External links
Jonny Reid Homepage 
Driver Database stats
Racing Reference - US Stats
Official Motorsport News Portal
Official A1 Grand Prix News Portal  
Official A1GP Team New Zealand Page  

1983 births
Living people
Sportspeople from Auckland
New Zealand racing drivers
Formula Ford drivers
Auto GP drivers
Japanese Formula 3 Championship drivers
A1 Team New Zealand drivers
Indy Lights drivers
Supercars Championship drivers
Formula Holden drivers
People educated at Saint Kentigern College
V8SuperTourer drivers
Australian Endurance Championship drivers
A1 Grand Prix drivers
Arrow McLaren SP drivers
Super Nova Racing drivers
Dick Johnson Racing drivers
Chip Ganassi Racing drivers